Joseph Gomes is a Canadian Citizen, immigrated from the country of Trinidad and Tobago.

Awards

Theatrical History

Living people
Year of birth missing (living people)